Jerome Agbo (born 19 June 1994) is a Ghanaian footballer who last played for Cypriot Third Division side Elpida Xylofagou as a central defender.

References

External links

1994 births
Living people
Association football defenders
Ghanaian footballers
Nea Salamis Famagusta FC players
Omonia Aradippou players
Digenis Oroklinis players
Cypriot First Division players
Cypriot Second Division players
Togolese people of Ghanaian descent
Ghanaian expatriate footballers
Expatriate footballers in Cyprus
Ghanaian expatriate sportspeople in Cyprus